Crataegus heldreichii is a species of flowering plant in the family Rosaceae. It is a hawthorn with red fruit that is native to Albania, Bulgaria, Greece and Yugoslavia.

References

heldreichii
Flora of Albania
Flora of Bulgaria
Flora of Greece
Flora of Yugoslavia
Taxa named by Pierre Edmond Boissier